Bhilai railway station (station code:- BIA) is located in Durg district, Chhattisgarh state (India). It serves Durg, Bhilai Nagar & Bhilai Power House and adjoining areas. Bhilai railway station is a part of South East Central Railway Zone. It is also one of the most prominent and important station in Howrah–Nagpur–Mumbai line. It is an 'A' grade station of Indian Railways in terms of passenger services.

History
Bhilai railway station started its functioning in 1891. Initially, Bhilai was the part of Bengal Nagpur Railway. The Nagpur–Asansol main line of Bengal Nagpur Railway which came up in 1891 covered Durg station for the first time.  The cross-country Howrah–Nagpur–Mumbai line, opened in 1890, was the second long route which passed through Bhilai railway station.

Bhilai Steel Plant, inaugurated on 4 February 1959, enhanced the importance of Bhilai railway station.

Electric Loco Shed
Bhilai Loco Shed holding 300+ electric locomotives. It is holds electric locomotives like WAG-7, WAP-7 & WAG-9. It also held a few WAM-4 locomotives, now scrapped or withdrawn.

It is now holding 110+ WAG-7, 50+ WAP-7 & 150+ WAG-9 locomotives respectively.

Electrification
The Bilaspur–Bhilai and Bhilai–Durg sections were  electrified in 1970–71. The Durg station got completely electrified by June 1971, Durg–Paniajob section in 1989–90. The Paniajob–Gondia and Gondia–Bhandara Road sections in 1990–91, Bhandara Road–Tharsa and Tharsa–Nagpur sections in 1991–92.

References

Railway stations in Durg district
Transport in Bhilai